John Thurman Hunter Jr. (July 13, 1931 – January 4, 2016), known by the stage name Long John Hunter, was an American Texas blues and electric blues guitarist, singer and songwriter. He released seven albums in his own name, and in his later years found critical acknowledgement outside of his homeland. Hunter's best known tracks are "El Paso Rock" and "Alligators Around My Door", the latter of which Hunter co-wrote with Bruce Iglauer.

Life and career
Hunter was born in Ringgold, Louisiana. He was raised on a farm in Magnolia, Arkansas, but by his early twenties was working in a box factory in Beaumont, Texas. He bought his first guitar after attending a B. B. King concert. He adopted the stage name Long John Hunter in 1953. His first single, "She Used to Be My Woman" backed with "Crazy Girl" was released by Duke Records in 1953. By 1957, he had relocated to El Paso, Texas, and found employment playing at the Lobby Club in Juárez, Mexico.  He remained there for over thirteen years, releasing several singles in the early 1960s on local record labels. These tracks included one of his most notable numbers, "El Paso Rock".

His album Texas Border Town Blues was released in 1988 and the album Ride with Me in 1992. These were followed by two more albums for Alligator Records, Border Town Legend (1996) and Swinging from the Rafters (1997). In 1999, Hunter teamed up with Lonnie Brooks and Phillip Walker to release Lone Star Shootout.

Hunter appeared at the Long Beach Blues Festival in 1996 and 2000. His last album was Looking for a Party (2009).

He died on January 4, 2016, at his home in Phoenix, Arizona.

Discography

See also
List of Texas blues musicians
List of electric blues musicians

References

1931 births
2016 deaths
American blues guitarists
American male guitarists
American blues singers
American male singers
Songwriters from Louisiana
Electric blues musicians
Singers from Louisiana
Texas blues musicians
People from Ringgold, Louisiana
Songwriters from Texas
Guitarists from Louisiana
Guitarists from Texas
20th-century American guitarists
20th-century American male musicians
American male songwriters